Barbara Strass (born 26 May 1974, in Vienna) is a former Austrian international team handball player, European Championship and World Championship bronze medalist and Olympic participant.

Strass holds the Austrian record of most international caps with 272 appearances.

Achievements
Women Handball Austria:
Winner: 1993, 1994, 1995, 1996, 1997
ÖHB Cup:
Winner: 1993, 1994, 1995, 1996, 1997
Bundesliga:
Winner: 2005, 2007
DHB-Pokal:
Winner: 2004, 2005
EHF Champions League:
Winner: 1993, 1994, 1995
EHF Challenge Cup:
Winner: 2004

References

External links
 Barbara Strass in the Austrian Handball Hall of Fame

1974 births
Living people
Handball players from Vienna
Austrian female handball players
Handball players at the 1992 Summer Olympics
Handball players at the 2000 Summer Olympics
Olympic handball players of Austria
Expatriate handball players
Austrian expatriate sportspeople in Germany
Austrian expatriate sportspeople in Denmark